Putyatin may refer to:
Putyatin (family), a princely family of Rurikid stock
Viktor Putyatin (1941–2021), Soviet fencer
Yevfimy Putyatin (1803–1883), Russian admiral
Putyatin (urban-type settlement), an urban-type settlement in Primorsky Krai, Russia
Putyatin Island